Megacera praelata is a species of beetle in the family Cerambycidae. It was described by Henry Walter Bates in 1866.

References

Agapanthiini
Beetles described in 1866